Collier Motors is a private car dealership primarily selling cars built by American Motors Corporation (AMC) as well as with other makes. The business was for many years an AMC franchised dealership located on business U.S. Route 117 in Pikeville, North Carolina.

Background 
Robert Collier established Collier Motors in 1955 as a single entrepreneur while in his 20s. His father was also in the automobile business and continued working until he was in his 80s. Collier transitioned from marketing Chevrolets to selling cars made by American Motors Corporation (AMC). The longstanding relationship with AMC continued until the automaker was partially purchased by Renault in 1979.

After AMC started importing Renault models from France, Collier decided he preferred to sell only domestic-designed and built cars. Rather than selling new Renault-derived passenger cars, such as the 1983 Alliance that was built in Kenosha, Wisconsin, Collier continued to sell the stock he already had on the lot and focused his dealership on older AMC cars and Jeep vehicles, as well as used vehicles of other US makes. American Motors was bought by Chrysler in 1987.

The  property is on the west side of old U.S. Route 117. By 2010, the business was described as having "vehicles and parts slowly returning to the soil." Collier died on 11 February 2018, at the age of 88. The administration of the estate was placed mainly on Robbie Collier, the oldest son.

Business 
Collier Motors sits frozen in time. Attempting to settle Robert Collier's estate, the Collier family continues to sell off the remaining inventory, though most have sat outside unprotected on the lot since the early 1980s. Inventory includes 1970s and 1980s-model AMCs, such as Gremlins, Pacers, Ambassadors, Matadors, Javelins, Eagles, Spirits, Hornets and Concords. Some of the cars still retain their original Monroney window stickers. Once the inventory has been sold or otherwise disposed of, the property will be cleared and listed for sale.

Historic AMC vehicles 
Historic vehicles owned by the Collier family and stored at the lot have included unique examples such as Barry Goldwater's two-seat AMX muscle car with a "tricked-out dash", two Alabama Highway Patrol Javelins, and a Nash from the 1991 movie The Marrying Man.

The policy has been to sell complete cars, not to part them out. A late-2021 estimate noted 40 "desirable" and restoration worthy cars that include some high-performance equipped AMCs.

Television 
In 2015, Collier Motors was featured on two History Channel shows: American Pickers (episode "A Hard Rain's Gonna Fall" originally aired 13 May 2015). and Lost in Transmission (episode "Fly Like an Eagle" originally aired 4 June 2015).
 Appeared in Season 1, Episode 7 of Roadworthy Rescues, “Rebel with a Cause”. The show first aired in fall of 2022, starring Derek Bieri, creator of the Vice Grip Garage YouTube channel.

References

Further reading

External links

 
 
 
 
 

American Motors
Auto dealerships of the United States
Retail companies established in 1955
Buildings and structures in Wayne County, North Carolina
Companies based in North Carolina
1955 establishments in North Carolina